Mykola Volodymyrovych Martynenko (born  12 January 1961) is a Ukrainian politician who was formerly a People's Deputy of Ukraine, as a member of the People's Front.

Martynenko was a member of the Verkhovna Rada from the 1998 Ukrainian parliamentary election until 2015. From 2009 until 2011 he headed the parliamentary faction of the Our Ukraine-People’s Self-Defense Bloc.

On 26 June 2020, a court in Switzerland found Martynenko guilty of money laundering, and sentenced him to 28 months in prison.

Involvement in embezzlement in Ukraine, Switzerland and Czech Republic
In December 2015 Martynenko resigned from parliament amid a corruption scandal.

He became the first people's deputy in the history of Ukraine who voluntarily refused the parliamentary mandate to show that he was not afraid of investigations against himself.  

Martynenko is suspected of organizing large-scale embezzlement by Ukrainian, Swiss and Czech authorities.

On October 8, 2015 M. Martynenko said that the case against him was instituted without any grounds on the order of the pro-Russian energy lobby and oligarchs as while he headed the parliamentary Committee on fuel and energy he defended the diversification of supplies of Russian gas and nuclear fuel, and the progressive law on the gas market adopted with the assistance of M.Martynenko did not allow billions of illegal super profits to be earned by the oligarchs  

On January 17, 2017, the court ordered NABU to close the so-called "Martynenko case" within 10 days  
but in the opinion of the former MP NABU took an unprecedented step - decided to illegally appeal against the court's decision which is based on the practice of the European Court of Human Rights, so it is final and can not be appealed. 

On March 30, 2017, Mykola Martynenko appealed to the National Anti-Corruption Bureau, the Verkhovna Rada, the President and ambassadors of the G-7 and the European Union in Ukraine on "political persecution, gross violations of the law and presumption of innocence". Martynenko reminded that in 2015 he voluntarily retired as the people's deputy of Ukraine and refused the parliamentary immunity. "During 15 months, the detectives of NABU found out: there is no evidence of my illegal activities. However, Artem Sytnyk and Gizo Uglava do not leave their intentions to falsify the charges against me. Unfortunately, the leaders of NABU are guided not by law but by political motives, aspirations for their own PR and personal revenge."

On December 19, 2019, the case in Switzerland, in which Martynenko appears, was transferred to a Swiss court. Martynenko's defense said this had happened under pressure and at the insistence of lawyers, publishing a copy of the appeal to the Federal Criminal Court of the Swiss Confederation. Martynenko's press service explained the procrastination of the Swiss prosecutor by the fact that there was no evidence in the case, so Köli "wanted to transfer the burden of proof in court to the Ukrainian SAP, NABU and the Ukrainian court." On June 26, 2020, a Swiss court of first instance sentenced him to 12 months in prison and up to 16 months probation Mykola Martynenko's Swiss lawyer Reza Vafadar stated that "in Switzerland a person is considered innocent and not convicted until all stages of the Swiss legal system have been passed - the appeal and the federal Supreme Court. "

On December 8, 2020, a Swiss State Police officer was fined for bribery but not for abuse of power, by a Zurich court, for receiving money from a former Stasi agent to investigate the Swiss Federal Court proceedings against Martynenko. The former Ukrainian politician was convicted of money laundering six month earlier, and sentenced to a lengthy prison sentence in Switzerland.

References

External links 

 Сайт Верховної Ради України

1961 births
People from Svitlovodsk
Living people
Third convocation members of the Verkhovna Rada
Fourth convocation members of the Verkhovna Rada
Fifth convocation members of the Verkhovna Rada
Sixth convocation members of the Verkhovna Rada
Seventh convocation members of the Verkhovna Rada
Eighth convocation members of the Verkhovna Rada
Our Ukraine (political party) politicians
People's Front (Ukraine) politicians
People of the Orange Revolution
Ukrainian politicians convicted of crimes
Ukrainian prisoners and detainees
Corruption in Ukraine
Prisoners and detainees of Switzerland